The 1963 Arizona Wildcats football team represented the University of Arizona in the Western Athletic Conference (WAC) during the 1963 NCAA University Division football season.  In their fifth season under head coach Jim LaRue, the Wildcats compiled a 5–5 record (2–2 in WAC, tie for third), and were outscored 166 to 136. The team captains were fullback Ted Christy and tackle Jerry Zeman, and their seven home games were played on campus at Arizona Stadium in Tucson.

The team's statistical leaders included Bill Brechler with 550 passing yards, Jim Oliver with 214 rushing yards, and Rickie Harris with 173 receiving yards.

Schedule

Season notes
 Arizona’s final two games against their rivals were originally going to be played on November 23 (vs. New Mexico) and November 30 (at Arizona State). However, in the wake of President Kennedy’s murder, all college football games were cancelled on November 23, and the Arizona–New Mexico game was rescheduled for December 7, while the ASU game remained as scheduled on November 30. Ironically, December 7 of the year was the 22nd anniversary of the Pearl Harbor attacks, where a battleship named after Arizona famously sunk. The Wildcats would go on to lose both games.

References

External links
 Game program: Arizona vs. Washington State at Spokane – October 5, 1963

Arizona
Arizona Wildcats football seasons
Arizona Wildcats football